(Parliamentary) Committee on Foreign Affairs (UU) is a parliamentary committee in the Swedish Riksdag. The committee prepares matters concerning the state's relationship to and agreements with other states and international organizations, assistance to other countries' development, representing the Swedish state abroad, as well as helping with diplomatic situations abroad. The committee also handles matters concerning foreign trade and international economic cooperation. They also handle matters that non of the other seventeen other parliamentary committees handle.

Since 2022, the Speaker of the committee is Aron Emilsson for the Sweden Democrats along with the vice-Speaker of the committee Morgan Johansson for the Social Democratic Party.

List of speakers for the committee

List of vice-speakers for the committee

References

External links 
Riksdag - Utrikesutskottet (Foreign Affairs Committee)

Committees of the Riksdag